Namma Preethiya Ramu is a 2003 Indian Kannada-language drama film directed by Sanjay-Vijay duo. The film is a remake of the  Malayalam film Vasanthiyum Lakshmiyum Pinne Njaanum (1999). The film stars Darshan playing the eponymous character of a blind village singer, along with Navya Natarajan, Hamsavijetha and Hanumanthegowda in other prominent roles. The film was produced by G Nandakumar and B P Rame Gowda for Vishwapriya Films studio. The film score and soundtrack was composed by Ilaiyaraaja.

The film was released on 14 November 2003 and won positive reviews from critics upon release. Actor Darshan was appreciated for his effective portrayal of an offbeat role. However, the film failed at the box office.

Cast
 Darshan as Ramu
 Navya Natarajan as Lakshmi
 Hamsavijetha as Vasanthi
 Doddanna
 Umashree
 Karibasavaiah
 Pavitra Lokesh
 Nandini
 Ramesh Pandith 
Shyam Yadav
Hanumanthegowda 
Jayasurya
 Master Adharsh Ramegowda as Putta

Soundtrack
The music of the film was composed by Ilaiyaraaja and the lyrics were written by K. Kalyan and Krishna Priya. Except "Dudilde" and "Badavana", all other tunes were reused from Tamil film Kaasi.

References

2003 films
Indian drama films
2000s Kannada-language films
Films about disability in India
Kannada remakes of Malayalam films
Films scored by Ilaiyaraaja
Films about blind people in India